Nathan Hubbard is an American business and music executive, and the founder of Rival, a ticketing startup.

Early life and education
Hubbard graduated summa cum laude from Princeton University, receiving a bachelor's degree in politics. Hubbard later received an MBA from Stanford Graduate School of Business.

Career
Hubbard began his career in the entertainment industry as a touring and recording singer/songwriter with the group Rockwell Church. The band released five albums.

Hubbard served as CEO of Musictoday until 2006, when the company was merged with Live Nation Entertainment. Hubbard then joined Live Nation, where he was the CEO of Live Nation Ticketing. After Live Nation merged with Ticketmaster in 2010, Hubbard served as CEO of Ticketmaster at Live Nation Entertainment until 2013. Hubbard oversaw the e-commerce division of Live Nation, working on ticketing and online sales. During his time at Ticketmaster, Hubbard attempted to improve public perception of Ticketmaster. In 2013, Hubbard was removed from Ticketmaster amid a power struggle with Michael Rapino, the CEO of Live Nation.

From August 2013 to 2016, Hubbard worked for Twitter as the company's first Vice President of Commerce and the interim Head of Global Media and Commerce. Hubbard was hired to work with retailers on making sales from their tweets through a "buy button." He left after Twitter disbanded its commerce team, stating that commuting from Los Angeles to San Francisco had been difficult for his family.

In 2018, Hubbard founded the ticketing company Rival, where he served as CEO. Hubbard hoped that the company would eventually compete with Ticketmaster. Rival had a contract with Kroenke Sports & Entertainment. In July 2019, Ticketmaster began providing transitional support to Rival. In March 2020, the Department of Justice approved Ticketmaster's acquisition of Rival and Hubbard sold the company.

Hubbard works for The Ringer, where he hosts the podcast Every Single Album: Taylor Swift alongside reporter Nora Princiotti.

Hubbard is on the board for Gibson.

References

Year of birth missing (living people)
Living people
American business executives
Live Nation Entertainment
Princeton University alumni
Twitter, Inc. people
21st-century American businesspeople
Stanford Graduate School of Business alumni